"Oh Millwall" was a single released by the English football team Millwall in 2004.  It reached number 41 in the UK Singles Chart.

References

2004 singles
Football songs and chants
Millwall F.C. songs
2004 songs